The 2022 Pacific League Climax Series (PLCS) was a set of two consecutive playoff series in Nippon Professional Baseball (NPB). The First Stage began on October 8 and the Final Stage concluded on October 15. The First Stage was a best-of-three series between the second-place Fukuoka SoftBank Hawks and the third-place Saitama Seibu Lions. The Final Stage was a best-of-six with the Orix Buffaloes, the Pacific League champion, being awarded a one-win advantage against the Hawks, the winner of the First Stage. The Buffaloes advanced to the 2022 Japan Series to compete against the Tokyo Yakult Swallows, the 2022 Central League Climax Series winner.

The First Stage in Fukuoka marked the final games for Hatsuhiko Tsuji as a manager, as he would step down and be replaced by former Lions shortstop Kazuo Matsui.

First stage

Summary

Game 1

Game 2

Final stage

Summary

Game 1

Game 2

Game 3

Game 4

References

Climax Series
Pacific League Climax Series
Pacific League Climax Series